John Twisleton (c 1614–1682), of Horsmans Place, Dartford, Kent was created a baronet by the Lord Protector Oliver Cromwell.  He was Sheriff of Kent.

Biography
John Twisleton was born about 1614, the son and heir of John Twisleton, of Drax and Barley, Yorkshire, and of Horsmans Place in Dartford, and Margaret, daughter of William Constable. He was admitted to Gray's Inn on 3 August 1629.

The Lord Protector Oliver Cromwell created John Twisleton a baronet on 10 April 1658, This dignity was disallowed after the Restoration in May 1660.

He was Sheriff of Kent for the year starting in 1671. He died on  4 December 1682, in his 69th year, and was buried (as "John Twisleton, Esq.") at Dartford.  In the south chancel of Dartford church is a mural monument of white marble erected to his memory.

Family
John Twisleton was married four times:
He married firstly (Lic. London 27 April 1636, he was 22 and she 19), Elizabeth, daughter and heir of Augustine Skinner, of Tolsham, or Tattsham Hall, Kent.
He married secondly, Lucy, 5th daughter of Samuel Dunch, of Baddesley, Berkshire. She was buried at Dartford.
He married thirdly (Lic. Fao. 12 May 1649, she was 18), Elizabeth (died 1674), eldest daughter and co-heir of James, Viscount Saye and Sele. She was buried at Bunhill fields. They had a daughter, Cecil, his only child, who married firstly George Twisleton, of Wormesly in Yorkshire, and secondly of Robert Mignon, and through whom the Baron Saye and Sele is descended.
He married fourthly, Anne, daughter and hier of John Christopher Meyern, a German. After Twisleton death she married Sir John Platt.

Notes

References

Attribution

1614 births
1682 deaths
People from Dartford
Baronets in the Baronetage of England
Members of Gray's Inn